Jiang Wu (born 4 November 1967) is a Chinese actor. He starred in Zhang Yimou's To Live (1994), and Zhang Yang's Shower (1999). He is the younger brother of Jiang Wen and is or was  a member of the Beijing Experimental Theatre Troupe.

Filmography 

 To Live (1994)
 A Beautiful New World (1998)
 Shower (1999)
 All the Way (2001)
 Roots and Branches (2001)
 One Hundred (2001)
 All the Invisible Children (2005)
 Gun of Mercy (2008)
 The Robbers (2009)
 Let the Bullets Fly (2010)
 The Warring States (2011)
 Wu Xia (2011)
 Snow Flower and the Secret Fan (2011)
 The Sorcerer and the White Snake (2011)
 1911 (2011)
 The Founding of a Party (2011)
 Speed Angels (2011)
 Lee's Adventure (2011)
 The Floating Shadow (2012)
 Happy Hotel (2012)
 Very Kidnappers (2012)
 A Touch of Sin (2013)
 Love at First Sight (2014)
 Bull Brothers (2014)
 Temporary Family (2014)
 Love on the Cloud (2014)
 Let's Get Married (2015)
 The Queens (2015)
 Lovers and Movies (2015)
 Monster Hunt (2015)
 Shock Wave (2017)
 The Mysterious Family (2017)
My People, My Country  (2019) 
The Eight Hundred (2019) 
Only Love Is Able to Remedy Us (2019)
The Legend Hunters (TBA)

References

External links 
 
Jiang Wu at the Chinese Movie Database

Male actors from Hebei
Living people
1967 births
Chinese male stage actors
People from Tangshan
20th-century Chinese male actors
21st-century Chinese male actors
Chinese male film actors
Chinese male television actors